Mannheim-Handelshafen station is a railway station in the municipality of Mannheim, located in Baden-Württemberg, Germany.

Notable places nearby
Mannheim Harbour

References

Handelshafen
Buildings and structures in Mannheim
Railway stations in Germany opened in 1985
1985 establishments in West Germany